The 1958 French Championships (now known as the French Open) was a tennis tournament that took place on the outdoor clay courts at the Stade Roland-Garros in Paris, France. The tournament ran from 20 May until 31 May. It was the 62nd staging of the French Championships, and the second Grand Slam tennis event of 1958. Mervyn Rose and Zsuzsi Körmöczy won the singles titles.

Finals

Men's singles

 Mervyn Rose defeated  Luis Ayala 6–3, 6–4, 6–4

Women's singles

 Zsuzsa Körmöczy (HUN) defeated  Shirley Bloomer (GBR)  6–4, 1–6, 6–2

Men's doubles
 Ashley Cooper /  Neale Fraser defeated  Bob Howe /  Abe Segal  3–6, 8–6, 6–3, 7–5

Women's doubles
 Rosie Reyes /  Yola Ramírez defeated  Mary Bevis Hawton /  Thelma Coyne Long 6–4, 7–5

Mixed doubles
 Shirley Bloomer /  Nicola Pietrangeli defeated  Lorraine Coghlan /  Bob Howe  8–6, 6–2

References

External links
 French Open official website

French Championships
French Championships (tennis) by year
French Champ
French Championships (tennis)
French Championships (tennis)